Lee Min-Soo (born January 11, 1992) is a South Korean football player.

Club statistics

References

External links

1992 births
Living people
Hannam University alumni
South Korean footballers
South Korean expatriate footballers
J1 League players
J2 League players
J3 League players
Korea National League players
K League 1 players
Shonan Bellmare players
Shimizu S-Pulse players
Tochigi SC players
FC Machida Zelvia players
Daejeon Korail FC players
Gangwon FC players
Expatriate footballers in Japan
South Korean expatriate sportspeople in Japan
Association football midfielders